Cuyamacamelus is an extinct monospecific genus in the camel family, endemic to North America.

References

Prehistoric camelids
Prehistoric even-toed ungulate genera
Miocene even-toed ungulates
Miocene mammals of North America